The RUSI Journal is a peer-reviewed academic journal covering international security and defence strategy. It was established in 1857 as the Royal United Services Institution Journal, obtaining its current title in 1972. The journal is published by Routledge on behalf of the Royal United Services Institute. The editor-in-chief is Emma De Angelis (Royal United Services Institute).

Abstracting and indexing

The journal is abstracted and indexed in EBSCO databases, the Emerging Sources Citation Index, ProQuest databases, and Scopus.

References

External links

Routledge academic journals
7 times per year journals
International relations journals
English-language journals
Publications established in 1857